Hélène Franco (born  in Lons-le-Saunier, Jura) is a French magistrate and politician. She is the general secretary of the Syndicat de la magistrature, the left-wing magistrates' labour union.

She was close to Jean-Luc Mélenchon in the Socialist Party (PS) and she followed him to form the Left Party when he left the PS in November 2008.

In 2009, she was selected to lead the Left Front list in the East constituency ahead of the 2009 European elections.

References

1971 births
Living people
21st-century French women politicians
Left Party (France) politicians
La France Insoumise politicians
People from Lons-le-Saunier
Sciences Po alumni
French people of Spanish descent